Mary Hanafin (born 1 June 1959) is an Irish Fianna Fáil politician who served as Minister for Tourism, Culture and Sport from 2010 to 2011, Deputy Leader of Fianna Fáil from January 2011 to March 2011, Minister for Enterprise, Trade and Innovation from January 2011 to March 2011, Minister for Social and Family Affairs from 2008 to 2011, Minister for Education and Science from 2004 to 2008, Government Chief Whip from 2002 to 2004 and Minister of State for Children from 2000 to 2002. She served as a Teachta Dála (TD) for the Dún Laoghaire constituency from 1997 to 2011.

She has served as a Councillor on Dún Laoghaire–Rathdown County Council, representing the Blackrock local electoral area since May 2014.

Early and personal life
Hanafin was born in Thurles, County Tipperary, in 1959. She is the daughter of Des and Mona Hanafin. Des Hanafin was a businessman and Fianna Fáil Councillor, who later served as a Senator at various times for over twenty-five years between 1969 and 2002. Her brother John Hanafin was a member of Seanad Éireann from 2002 to 2011.

Hanafin was educated at the Presentation Convent in Thurles and St. Patrick's College in Maynooth, receiving a Bachelor of Arts degree. She subsequently worked as a secondary school teacher, teaching Irish and History in the Dominican College Sion Hill in Blackrock, Dublin. Hanafin also obtained a diploma in legal studies at the Dublin Institute of Technology.

Hanafin married Eamon Leahy, a Senior Counsel, in 1985. He died suddenly on 17 July 2003, aged 46. The couple had no children.

Early political career
Hanafin was involved in politics from the age of 15. Her father Des Hanafin, as well as being a Senator for Fianna Fáil, was a founding member of the Society for the Protection of Unborn Children (SPUC) and a staunch opponent of contraception, abortion and divorce. She joined Ógra Fianna Fáil aged fifteen and spoke at her first Ard Fheis two years later. Hanafin first became involved in national politics in 1980 when, at the age of twenty-one, she was elected to the Fianna Fáil national executive, the party's ruling body.

She was elected to Dublin City Council at the 1985 local elections for the Rathmines local electoral area, but she unsuccessfully sought election to Dáil Éireann at the 1989 general election, standing in the Dublin South-East constituency. She lost her seat on Dublin City Council in 1991 and became involved in the running of the Fianna Fáil party. She was elected as national treasurer in 1993. Hanafin is also a former president of the National Youth Council of Ireland.

Dáil career
Hanafin was elected to the Dáil on her second attempt, at the 1997 general election for the Dún Laoghaire constituency. In her first few years as a TD she served on a number of Oireachtas committees, including Education and Science, Heritage and the Irish language and Justice, Equality and Women's Affairs. In 2000, Hanafin was appointed Minister of State for Children. She topped the poll in her constituency at the 2002 general election and was appointed to the position of Minister of State at the Department of the Taoiseach; also a junior (non-cabinet) ministry, but with special responsibility as Government Chief Whip. She was the first woman to hold this position.

Minister for Education and Science
Hanafin was appointed as Minister for Education and Science in a cabinet reshuffle in September 2004. She abandoned the compilation of school league tables begun by her predecessor Noel Dempsey. She prioritised school bus safety following the death of five schoolgirls near Navan, County Meath, in 2005. This has mandated the provision of one seat per child and of the mandatory use of seatbelts in school buses. In 2005 she initiated vastly increased funding and staffing for children with special needs.
She announced plans for a possible change of entry requirements to third-level medical education.

Hanafin was accused of bias towards private fee-paying schools in her constituency when awarding building grants to them in 2005. Christian Brothers College, Monkstown Park, and St. Andrew's College both received building grants for extensions and works on their buildings. Only Belvedere College, Kilkenny College and Loreto Beaufort, Rathfarnham, had previously received money since 1995.

Diplomatic cables published by Wikileaks revealed that in 2005 Hanafin had briefed the American Ambassador to Ireland on government coalition negotiations. She criticized her Green Party coalition colleagues saying that they wanted to prioritize "hares, stags and badgers while everyone else in the country is drowning in this economy".

In February 2008, it emerged that Hanafin, while Government Chief Whip, had assisted poet Cathal Ó Searcaigh to obtain an Irish visa for a Nepalese youth. The allegations were contained in the documentary Fairytale of Kathmandu. Hanafin, who admitted being friends with Ó Searcaigh for many years, dismissed the allegations as an "irresponsible piece of journalism". Ó Searcaigh was later investigated by Irish authorities to establish whether he should be prosecuted under the Sexual Offences Act for sleeping with boys in Nepal who would be considered under-age in Ireland.

Hanafin was accused in February 2008 of being oblivious to the plight of parents of children with autism, and of taking an imperious view of their parents' situation, when she decided to engage in a 68-day court battle with two parents who were attempting to obtain appropriate education for their children through the applied behavior analysis (ABA) method. She and her department were accused of ignoring reality of autism education requirements. The mother, Yvonne Ui Cuanachain, said: "Well I would reject the Minister's position quite completely and I feel it's actually quite cynically misrepresentative of the situation on the ground. The Department of Education does not support ABA, it does not support ABA within the ABA schools and neither does it support ABA within the eclectic classes."

Minister for Social and Family Affairs
On 7 May 2008, Hanafin was appointed as Minister for Social and Family Affairs by new Taoiseach Brian Cowen. She abolished an independent agency, Combat Poverty, by subsuming it into the department.

In late May 2009, a newspaper ran a story claiming Hanafin's office had used taxpayer-funded resources to promote Peter O'Brien in correspondence to voters in the ahead of the 2009 local elections. O'Brien was not elected at those local elections.

Minister for Tourism, Culture and Sport
On 23 March 2010, Hanafin was moved from Social and Family Affairs to the Tourism, Culture and Sport portfolio. She appointed a Fianna Fáil councillor and friend of Brian Cowen to the board of the Irish Sports Council on her last full day as Tourism, Culture and Sport Minister.

Minister for Enterprise, Trade and Innovation
Following the resignation of Batt O'Keeffe in January 2011, Hanafin was also appointed as Minister for Enterprise, Trade and Innovation.

2011 general election
On 22 January 2011, after the resignation of Brian Cowen, Hanafin put her name forward as a candidate for leader of Fianna Fáil. She was appointed Deputy Leader on 31 January 2011. At the 2011 general election she lost her Dáil seat to Richard Boyd Barrett of the People Before Profit. She briefly withdrew from public life, but in April 2011, the Fianna Fáil National Executive co-opted her as one of the five vice-presidents of the party.

After national politics

Television
In January 2012, she appeared as a judge on the TG4 television show An G-Team. In 2014 Hanafin received a master's degree in American Studies at the Clinton Institute in University College Dublin.

Business interests
Hanafin is reported to have extensive business interests. In June 2008, it was reported she owned a 15% shareholding in Reservoir Resources, an oil exploration company. In September 2013, it was reported she had bought shares in a company which owns Zaragoza, a Dublin tapas bar.

Return to politics

2014 local elections
In May 2014, Hanafin lodged nomination papers with Dún Laoghaire–Rathdown County Council to contest the local government elections in the Blackrock area, against the wishes of Fianna Fáil leader Micheál Martin. Following a three-week campaign—dubbed the "Battle of Blackrock"—she was elected, taking the second out of six seats in the Blackrock local electoral area.

Dún Laoghaire–Rathdown County Council

State pensions and council expenses
Hanafin has said she does not take expenses from Dún Laoghaire–Rathdown County Council, instead continues to draw her various state pensions accruing from her time as a teacher, TD and Minister. In July 2015, an RTÉ investigative report estimated the state had paid her €520,775 in pension and lump sum payments since 2011. This figure excludes any pension associated with her time as a teacher.

2016 general election campaign
In April 2014, Hanafin indicated that she intended to seek the Fianna Fáil nomination in Dún Laoghaire for the next general election. Her fellow councillors Cormac Devlin and Kate Feeney also expressed an interest in seeking the nomination. The contest attracted widespread media attention being dubbed the "Battle of Blackrock II".

In early September 2015, there was widespread speculation the Fianna Fáil National Constituencies Committee would attempt to exclude Cormac Devlin from the Dún Laoghaire candidate selection convention on the basis of his gender. Following the threat of legal action from Devlin, the party backed down.

Hanafin lost the Dún Laoghaire Fianna Fáil selection convention on 28 September 2015, coming second to Cormac Devlin.

Two days after the selection convention, on 30 September 2015, the National Constituencies Committee of Fianna Fáil, chaired by Michael Moynihan TD, recommended Hanafin be added to the general election ticket in Dún Laoghaire.

In October 2015, it emerged that Hanafin, while Minister for Tourism in 2009, supported potential legislation to introduce a €500 water charge and metering system in July 2010, five months before the bailout.

In January 2016, Hanafin announced she was seeking a place on the Fianna Fáil Front Bench. Micheal Martin refused to be drawn on the issue, instead emphasising a desire to promote a new generation of TDs. Following his rebuff, Hanafin gave a series of interviews which appeared to undermine his authority, in particular she questioned his position on entering coalition government with Fine Gael. Her remarks prompted Mary Cowen, wife of former Taoiseach, Brian Cowen, to publicly comment that Micheal Martin should "watch his back" around Hanafin. The spat continued with Hanafin claiming Mary Cowen's remarks were inappropriate.

In the 2016 general election Hanafin failed to regain a seat in the Dáil, finishing fifth in the four-seat Dún Laoghaire constituency.

2019 European Parliament election
In December 2018, Hanafin announced her intention to seek the Fianna Fáil nomination for the Dublin constituency in the European Parliament. Barry Andrews was selected as the Fianna Fáil candidate.

2020 general election
She was an unsuccessful candidate for the Dún Laoghaire constituency at the 2020 general election.

In June 2022, she was elected as Cathaoirleach of Dún Laoghaire–Rathdown County Council.

References

External links

1959 births
Alumni of Dublin Institute of Technology
Alumni of St Patrick's College, Maynooth
Women government ministers of the Republic of Ireland
Fianna Fáil TDs
Mary
Irish schoolteachers
Living people
Local councillors in Dublin (city)
Local councillors in Dún Laoghaire–Rathdown
Members of the 28th Dáil
Members of the 29th Dáil
Members of the 30th Dáil
20th-century women Teachtaí Dála
21st-century women Teachtaí Dála
Ministers for Education (Ireland)
Ministers for Social Affairs (Ireland)
Ministers of State of the 28th Dáil
Ministers of State of the 29th Dáil
People from Thurles
Women ministers of state of the Republic of Ireland
Government Chief Whip (Ireland)
Ministers for Enterprise, Trade and Employment
Mayors of places in the Republic of Ireland